Nye Perram (born 1969) is an Australian judge. He has been a Judge of the Federal Court of Australia since his appointment in August 2008 at the age of 39. Prior to his appointment, Perram practised as a Senior Counsel in Sydney.

Perram was educated at Sydney Boys' High School, and holds degrees in arts and law from the University of Sydney, and a Bachelor of Civil Law from the University of Oxford. He was admitted as a solicitor in 1992 (practising briefly with Mallesons Stephen Jaques) and then as a barrister before becoming Senior Counsel in 2006. While at the bar, Perram was a member of the New South Wales Bar Council.

In addition to being a judge, Perram is also a Deputy President of the Copyright Tribunal of Australia, a Part-Time Commissioner with the Australian Law Reform Commission, and a Presidential Member of the Administrative Appeals Tribunal.

Perram also represented deposed Prime Minister of Fiji Laisenia Qarase in legal proceedings against his military replacement, Frank Bainimarama.

See also
List of Judges of the Federal Court of Australia

References

Living people
University of Sydney alumni
Alumni of the University of Oxford
Judges of the Federal Court of Australia
1969 births
Australian Senior Counsel